John Oldring  (born September 2, 1952) is a former municipal provincial level politician from Alberta, Canada. He served as a member of the Red Deer City Council from 1974 to 1986 before becoming a member of the Legislative Assembly of Alberta from 1986 to 1993.

Political career
Oldring served for 12 years as a city councillor for the Red Deer City Council. He was first elected in 1974 and retired in 1986 to run for a seat in the Alberta Legislature. He ran as a Progressive Conservative candidate for the provincial general election held that year in the new electoral district of Red Deer South. Oldring won the district easily defeating two other candidates. He stood for a second term in office in the 1989 Alberta general election. He won his second term increasing his plurality. Oldring was appointed to the cabinet by Premier Don Getty after the election in 1989. He served as Minister of Family and Social Services and decided to run as a candidate in the 1992 Progressive Conservative Leadership Convention, eventually losing to Ralph Klein. After the leadership election Oldring was not reappointed to the cabinet and retired from provincial politics at dissolution of the Assembly in 1993.

References

External links
Legislative Assembly of Alberta Members Listing

 

1952 births
Living people
Members of the Executive Council of Alberta
Red Deer, Alberta city councillors
Progressive Conservative Association of Alberta MLAs